Cypenamine (INN, BAN), or cypenamine hydrochloride (USAN), also known as 2-phenylcyclopentylamine, is a psychostimulant drug which was developed by a group at the William S. Merrell Chemical Company in the 1940s. It is currently known only in scientific research and has never been developed for market use. Cypenamine is currently legal throughout the entire world, and though its chemical structure has a vague similarity to certain controlled stimulants like fencamfamine, it is likely that it is too distant for it to be considered an illicit analogue under the United States Federal Analogue Act of the Controlled Substances Act.

Chemistry

Stereochemistry
2-Phenylcyclopentan-1-amine is a compound with two stereocenters. Thus, the following two enantiomeric pairs may exist:

 (1RS,2SR)-trans-2-phenylcyclopentan-1-amine
 (1RS,2RS)-cis-2-phenylcyclopentan-1-amine

Furthermore, the kinetic resolution of (±)-trans-2-phenylcyclopentan-1-amine by lipase B from Candida antarctica may be effectively performed by an aminolysis reaction.

Racemic cis-2-phenylcyclopentan-1-amine [1:1 mixture of (1R,2R)-cis-2-phenylcyclopentan-1-amine and (1S,2S)-cis-2-phenylcyclopentan-1-amine] has found no pharmacological application.

Homology
Cypenamine is a homolog of tranylcypromine, containing an expanded alicyclic ring that is two methylene units larger than the highly strained/reactive cyclopropane. The cyclohexane homologue has been reported, although the LD50s were all less than for plain amphetamine, it was still a functional stimulant.

See also
 Amphetamine
 Cyclopentamine
 Methamphetamine
 Propylhexedrine

References

Amines
Norepinephrine-dopamine releasing agents
Sympathomimetics
Stimulants